Fresno is a district (parroquia rural) of the municipality of Gijón / Xixón, in Asturias, Spain.

The population of Fresno was 712 in 2003 and 597 in 2012.

Fresno is a heavily industrialized area of Gijón / Xixón.

Villages and their neighbourhoods
Fresno
Somonte
Montiana
Villar

External links
 Official Toponyms - Principality of Asturias website.
 Official Toponyms: Laws - BOPA Nº 229 - Martes, 3 de octubre de 2006 & DECRETO 105/2006, de 20 de septiembre, por el que se determinan los topónimos oficiales del concejo de Gijón.

Parishes in Gijón